Kendall Newson (born March 5, 1980) is a former American football wide receiver in the National Football League. He was selected by the Jacksonville Jaguars in the 7th round (222nd overall) of the 2002 NFL Draft. He played collegiately at Middle Tennessee State University.

He was also a member of the Tennessee Titans, Miami Dolphins, Rhein Fire, and Hamilton Tiger-Cats

In 2013, he entered the world of pro fishing by competing in the Bassmaster Elite Series of tournaments.

References

1980 births
Living people
American football wide receivers
Middle Tennessee Blue Raiders football players
Jacksonville Jaguars players
Tennessee Titans players
Miami Dolphins players
Rhein Fire players
Hamilton Tiger-Cats players